Thaddeus John Szarkowski (December 18, 1925 – July 7, 2007) was an American photographer, curator, historian, and critic. From 1962 to 1991 Szarkowski was the director of photography at New York's Museum of Modern Art (MoMA).

Early life and career
He was born and grew up in the small northern Wisconsin city of Ashland, and became interested in photography at age eleven. In World War II Szarkowski served in the U.S. Army, after which he graduated in 1947 in art history from the University of Wisconsin–Madison. He then began his career as a museum photographer at the Walker Art Center, Minneapolis.

At this time he was also a practicing art photographer; he had his first solo show at the Walker Art Center in 1949, the first of a number of solo exhibitions. In 1954 Szarkowski received the first of two Guggenheim Fellowships, resulting in the book The Idea of Louis Sullivan (1956). Between 1958 and 1962, he returned to rural Wisconsin. There, he undertook a second Guggenheim fellowship in 1961, researching into ideas about wilderness and the relationship between people and the land.

Museum of Modern Art
New York's Museum of Modern Art appointed Szarkowski director of its department of photography, beginning July 1, 1962. Edward Steichen chose Szarkowski as his successor. In 1973 Szarkowski began service to the National Endowment for the Arts as one of its three photography panelists.

In 1973 Szarkowski published Looking at Photographs a practical set of examples on how to write about photographs. The book is still required reading for students of photography, and argues for the importance of looking carefully and bringing to bear every bit of intelligence and understanding possessed by the viewer. Szarkowski has also published numerous books on individual photographers, including, with Maria Morris Hamburg, the definitive four-volume work on the photography of Atget.

He wrote Mirrors and Windows: American Photography Since 1960 (1978) identifying a dichotomy between strategies of pictorial expression in American photography; "It seems to this viewer that the difference between [Minor] White and [Robert] Frank relates to the difference between the goal of self-expression and the goal of exploration." Though not all photographers in the book are American (Frank was Swiss, for example), the pictures were taken and/or exhibited there. The publication is divided almost equally into Parts I (pps. 29–86) and II (pps. 87–148). His 'Mirror' analogy represents self-reflective photography, represented in the book by Jerry N. Uelsmann, Paul Caponigro, Joseph Bellanca, Gianni Penati, Ralph Gibson, Duane Michals, Judy Dater and others; while the idea of the 'Window' is found in the documentary approach, exemplified by inclusions of work by Diane Arbus, Lee Friedlander, Henry Wessel, Joel Meyerowitz, and Garry Winogrand.

He taught at Harvard, Yale, and New York University, and continued to lecture and teach. From 1983 to 1989, he was an Andrew Dickson White Professor-at-Large at Cornell University. In 1990, U.S. News & World Report said: "Szarkowski's thinking, whether Americans know it or not, has become our thinking about photography".

In 1991 Szarkowski retired from his post at the MoMA, during which he had developed a reputation for being somewhat autocratic, and became the museum's photography director emeritus. He was succeeded by Peter Galassi, the Joel and Anne Ehrenkranz chief curator of the department of photography at The Museum of Modern Art.

Exhibitions curated by Szarkowski
1963: The Photographer and the American Landscape. Museum of Modern Art, New York.
1964: André Kertész. Museum of Modern Art, New York. Retrospective exhibition.
1964: The Photographer's Eye. Museum of Modern Art, New York.
1965: The Photo Essay. Museum of Modern Art, New York.
1966: Dorothea Lange. Museum of Modern Art, New York. Retrospective exhibition.
1967: Once Invisible. Museum of Modern Art, New York.
1967: New Documents. Museum of Modern Art, New York.
1968: Henri Cartier-Bresson. Museum of Modern Art, New York. Retrospective exhibition.
1968: Brassai. Museum of Modern Art, New York. Retrospective exhibition.
1969: Bill Brandt. Museum of Modern Art, New York. Retrospective exhibition.
1969: Eugene Atget. Museum of Modern Art, New York. Retrospective exhibition.
1969: Garry Winogrand: The Animals. Museum of Modern Art, New York.
1970: New Acquisitions. Museum of Modern Art, New York.
1970: Bruce Davidson: East 100th Street. Museum of Modern Art, New York.
1970: E.J. Bellocq: Storyville Portraits. Museum of Modern Art, New York
1971: Photographs by Walker Evans. Museum of Modern Art, New York Retrospective exhibition.
1972: Diane Arbus. Museum of Modern Art, New York. Retrospective exhibition.
1990: Photography Until Now. Museum of Modern Art, New York
1995: Ansel Adams at 100. San Francisco Museum of Modern Art, CA. Curated with Sandra S. Phillips.

Retirement
In retirement, Szarkowski served on the boards of several of the mutual funds sold by Dreyfus Corporation.  Szarkowski returned to making his own photographic work, mostly attempting to picture a spirit of place in the American landscape. In 2005 he had several major solo exhibitions across the USA. The first retrospective of his work was exhibited at MoMA in early 2006.

Szarkowski died from complications of a stroke on July 7, 2007, in Pittsfield, Massachusetts, aged 81.

Publications

In conjunction with exhibitions curated by Szarkowski 
"The Photographs of Jacques Henri Lartigue", New York: Museum of Modern Art, 1963. ASIN B0018MX7JK
The Animals, New York: Museum of Modern Art, 1969. ASIN B0006BWLBO
E.J. Bellocq Storyville Portraits, New York: Little Brown & Co, 1970. 
From the Picture Press, New York: Museum of Modern Art, 1973. 
New Japanese Photography, New York: Museum of Modern Art, 1974. 
William Eggleston's Guide, New York: Museum of Modern Art, 1976. 
Callahan, New York: Museum of Modern Art; New York, Aperture, 1976. 
Mirrors and Windows: American Photography since 1960, New York: Museum of Modern Art, 1978. 
American Landscapes, New York: Museum of Modern Art, 1981. 
Irving Penn, New York: Museum of Modern Art, 1984. 
Winogrand: Figments from the Real World, New York: Museum of Modern Art, 1988. 
Photography Until Now, New York: Museum of Modern Art, 1989. 
Ansel Adams at 100, 2001.

Photographic theory by Szarkowski 
The Photographer's Eye, New York: Museum of Modern Art, 1966. 
Looking at Photographs., New York: Museum of Modern Art, 1973.

Writing contributions by Szarkowski 
The Portfolios of Ansel Adams. New York: Bulfinch, 1977. .
Wright Morris: Origin of a Species. San Francisco: San Francisco Museum of Modern Art, 1992. .
Jan Groover: Photographs. New York: Bulfinch, 1993. .
Alfred Stieglitz at Lake George. New York: Museum of Modern Art, 1995. ASIN B00276L2CA.
Bellocq: Photographs from Storyville, the Red-Light District of New Orleans. New York: Random House, 1996. .
A Maritime Album: 100 Photographs and Their Stories. New Haven: Yale University Press, 1997. .
Atget. New York: Callaway, 2000. .
Still Life: Irving Penn Photographs, 1938–2000. Thames & Hudson, 2001. .
Nature. Göttingen: Steidl; New York: Pace/MacGill, 2007. .
Slide Show: The Color Photographs of Helen Levitt. Levitt; New York: powerHouse Books, 2005. .

Containing Szarkowski's photographic works
The Idea of Louis Sullivan, Minneapolis: University of Minnesota Press, 1956. ASIN B0041LVXMS
The Face of Minnesota, Minneapolis: University of Minnesota Press, 1958.  ASIN: B0000CK4KY
Mr. Bristol's Barn, Harry N Abrams, 1997. 
John Szarkowski: Photographs. New York: Bulfinch, 2005. . Text by Sandra S. Phillips.

Documentaries about Szarkowski
John Szarkowski: A Life in Photography (Checkerboard, 1998). 48-minute documentary on his life and work.
Speaking of Art: John Szarkowski on John Szarkowski (Checkerboard, 2005). 60-minute film of a lecture in which he talks about his own photography.

Exhibitions of Szarkowski's photographs
2005–2006: John Szarkowski: Photographs, San Francisco Museum of Modern Art, 5 February – 15 May 2005 and toured to Museum of Modern Art, New York, 1 February – 15 May 2006.

References

Further reading
Philip Gefter. "The Photographer's Curator Curates His Own," The New York Times, (January 30, 2005)
Andy Grundberg. "An Interview with John Szarkowski". Afterimage, Volume 12 No. 3 (October 1984), pages 12–13.
"An interview with John Szarkowski". Modern Painters (Spring 2004).
Hilton Als. "Looking at Pictures". Grand Street, No. 59, page 102.
Mark Haworth-Booth. "An Interview with John Szarkowski". History of Photography, Vol. 15, No. 4 (1991), pages 302–306.

External links
LA Weekly interview with Szarkowski from December 2006. "Talking Pictures" by Holly Myers and Tom Christie.
New York Times obituary in 2007

1925 births
2007 deaths
People associated with the Museum of Modern Art (New York City)
American art curators
20th-century American photographers
Cornell University faculty
Harvard University faculty
New York University faculty
People from Ashland, Wisconsin
Photography critics
Photography curators
University of Wisconsin–Madison College of Letters and Science alumni
Yale University faculty